Anolis limifrons, also known commonly as the slender anole or the border anole, is a species of lizard in the family Dactyloidae. The species is native to Central America.

Geographic range
A. limifrons is found in Guatemala, Belize, Honduras, Nicaragua, Costa Rica, and Panama.

Reproduction
A. limifrons is oviparous.

References

Further reading
Cope ED (1862). "Contributions to Neotropical Saurology". Proceedings of the Academy of Natural Sciences of Philadelphia 14: 176–188. ("Anolis (Dracontura) limifrons ", new species, pp. 178–179).
Savage JM (2002). The Amphibians and Reptiles of Costa Rica: A Herpetofauna between Two Continents, between Two Seas. Chicago and London: University of Chicago Press. xx + 934 pp. . (Norops limifrons, pp. 470–474 + Plate 270).

Anoles
Reptiles described in 1862
Taxa named by Edward Drinker Cope